Pierre-Emmanuel Garcia (born 5 May 1983, Narbonne, France) is a French-born Spanish rugby union player. He plays as a centre.

Garcia currently plays for Castres Olympique, in the French Top 14.

He has 4 caps for Spain, since 2012.

References

External links
 ESPN Scrum profile

1983 births
Living people
People from Narbonne
Spanish rugby union players
Spain international rugby union players
Rugby union centres
ASM Clermont Auvergne players
Sportspeople from Aude
French rugby union players
French people of Spanish descent
Castres Olympique players